Margaret Ann Wilks (born 6 November 1950) is an English former cricketer who played as an all-rounder. She was a left-handed batter and right-arm medium bowler. She played for Young England in the 1973 Women's Cricket World Cup and the full England side in the 1978 Women's Cricket World Cup. She scored 51 runs and took four wickets in her nine One Day Internationals. Her best bowling performance came against India in 1978, when she claimed two wickets and conceded just six runs. She played domestic cricket for West of England.

References

External links
 
 

1950 births
Living people
Cricketers from Southampton
England women One Day International cricketers
Young England women cricketers
West women cricketers